Alfred Nakache (1915–1983) was a Jewish French swimmer and water polo player. A member of the French team for the 1936 Berlin Summer Olympic Games, he also swam in the first post-war Summer Olympics in London in 1948. He is one of two Jewish athletes, as far as is known, to have competed in the Olympics after surviving the Holocaust.

Biography
Nakache set the world record in the 200 metre breaststroke with a time of 2:36.8 on 6 July 1941 in the long course seawater pool in Catalans in Marseilles.  Since FINA at the time recognized world records set in either short course (25 metre) or long course (50 metre) pools for the 200 metre breaststroke, his record was easily broken by Joe Verdeur in 1946 in a short course pool.  If records were measured as they are today in long and short course pools, Verdeur would have broken Nakache's long course world record of 2:36.8 in 1948 at the US Olympic trials with a time of 2:36.3.  With Alexandre Jany and Georges Vallerey Jr., he broke the world record for 3 X 100m medley on August 8, 1946.

Nakache was inducted into the International Jewish Sports Hall of Fame in 1993 and the International Swimming Hall of Fame in 2019. He was the subject of a French documentary in 2001, entitled Alfred Nakache, the Swimmer of Auschwitz and the 2017 French documentary entitled “Nage Libre”, directed by Thierry Lashéras, coproduced by EVA Productions and France Télévisions, with the participation of French Olympic swimmer Fabien Gilot , in the steps of Nakache.

At 12 August 1941 he had a French Jewish girl daughter named Annie Nakache, born in Constantine (Algeria). She lived in Toulouse. She was a daughter of the swimmer with Ms. Paule Nakache. In January 1944 she was deported to Auschwitz with her parents and later was murdered in a gas chamber with her mother Paule. (font: Memorial Auschwitz).
After ending his career in Reunion Island, he died on August 4, 1983, following a malaise while swimming in the port of Cerbère.
He is buried in the Le Py cemetery in Sète.

Records & championships

World—200 m butterfly—1941
World—relay 3 X 100 m3 strokes—1946
Europe—100 m butterfly—1941
France—400 m butterfly—1943
France—relay 4 X 200 m freestyle—1946
Champion of France—100 m freestyle in 1935–38, and 1941–42
Champion of France—200 m freestyle in 1937–38, and 1941–42
Champion of France—200 m butterfly in 1938, 1941–42, and 1946
Champion of France—400 m freestyle in 1942
Champion of France—relay 4 X 200 m freestyle in 1937–39, 1942, 1944–52 (13 titles, including 9 consecutive)
University champion—100 m freestyle in 1936
Champion of North Africa—100 m freestyle in 1931

Maccabiah Games silver medal in 1935–100 m freestyle

See also
List of select Jewish swimmers
World record progression 200 metres breaststroke

References

External links
Jewish Sports bio
Jews in Sports bio
Alfred Nakache in Yad Vashem website

Sportspeople from Constantine, Algeria
1915 births
1983 deaths
Male butterfly swimmers
French male freestyle swimmers
20th-century French Jews
Jewish swimmers
Olympic swimmers of France
Olympic water polo players of France
Swimmers at the 1936 Summer Olympics
Swimmers at the 1948 Summer Olympics
French male water polo players
World record setters in swimming
Auschwitz concentration camp survivors
Algerian Jews
European Aquatics Championships medalists in swimming